Cape Campbell, Te Karaka in the Māori language, is in Marlborough, New Zealand, on the northeastern coast of the South Island. Cape Campbell lies close to the salt works at Lake Grassmere.

It is the third-easternmost point of the South Island, at a longitude of about 174o16.5' East.
(The two easternmost points are West head (it is the western shore of the opening to Tory Channel - the opposing shore being on Arapaoa Island), and Cape Jackson (between the entrances to Queen Charlotte Sound and Port Gore), both at a longitude of 174o19' east.)

It was named by Captain James Cook after Captain (later Vice-Admiral) John Campbell, who had been a strong supporter of Cook's as Observer for the Royal Society.

The Cape Campbell Lighthouse has guided ships rounding the cape since 1870.

The third night of the  Cape Campbell Track  is spent at Cape Campbell, where the lighthouse keepers once stayed.  When walking the Cape Campbell Track, a four-day private walking track, walkers retrace part of the original packtrack used by the lighthouse keepers to obtain vital supplies from the Flaxbourne Station Homestead where the first telegraph office stood.

References

External links

Cape Campbell at Land Information New Zealand.

Headlands of the Marlborough Region
Cook Strait